Boʻzsuv ( or) is an urban-type settlement in Tashkent Region, Uzbekistan. It is part of Yangiyoʻl District. The town population in 1989 was 3673 people.

References

Populated places in Tashkent Region
Urban-type settlements in Uzbekistan